Samantha Kate Winward (born 12 October 1985) is an English actress, singer and model.  She is best known for playing the role of Katie Sugden in the ITV soap opera Emmerdale from 2001 to 2015.

Early life
Winward was born in Bolton, Greater Manchester, England. She attended Turton High School Media Arts College in Bromley Cross, South Turton, England.

Personal life
Winward was engaged to footballer David Dunn. Their daughter Mia was born at home in Edgworth, Lancashire on 12 June 2005.

Career
In January 2006, Winward appeared and participated on the ITV show Soapstar Superstar.

In late 2006, she was voted number 73 in the FHM's 100 Sexiest Women in the World.

Winward first appeared as Katie Sugden in the ITV soap opera Emmerdale in July 2001 at the age of 15. In 2002, Winward was nominated for Most Popular Newcomer award at the National Television Awards for the role of Katie Sugden in Emmerdale. In November 2014, Winward announced that she would leave Emmerdale in February 2015 after 13 years to pursue other interests, projects and acting roles. On 5 February, Katie died due to a fall at Wylie's Farm after falling through rotten floorboards after being pushed to the ground by her ex-lover and brother-in-law Robert Sugden (previously Karl Davies/now Ryan Hawley).

In May 2015, it was announced that Winward was to appear in the second series of the ITV drama Prey. Winward played the role of Lucy, the heavily pregnant daughter of prison officer David Murdoch (Philip Glenister) who is threatened, leaving her father on the run after finding himself on the wrong side of the law. The second series aired in December 2015.

Sammy has also made a guest appearance on Holly and Stephen’s Saturday Showdown during which she was gunged.

Filmography

Guest appearances
 30 Years of Emmerdale (12 October 2002) - TV Documentary
 GMTV (25 November 2003) - 1 Episode
 This Morning (12 February 2004, 7 May 2004, 6 January 2006, 9 January 2006, 22 May 2006, 21 September 2010) - 6 Episodes
 Loose Women (2004–05, 2007–08, 2012, 2015) - 8 Episodes
 Emmerdale: The Sugden Family Album (6 June 2005) - TV Documentary
 Orange Playlist (24 March 2006) - 1 Episode
 The British Soap Awards (2006) - TV Special
 Xposé (24 April 2007) - 1 Episode
 All Star Family Fortunes (6 June 2007) - 1 Episode
 Emmerdale 5000 (26 May 2008) - TV Documentary
 Ant & Dec's Saturday Night Takeaway (14 March 2009) - 1 Episode
 The Factor (24 November 2012) - 1 Episode
 The Chase (30 November 2013) - 1 Episode - Celebrity Special
 Loose Women (17 August 2021) - 1  episode

Awards and nominations

References

External links

1985 births
Living people
English television actresses
English soap opera actresses
English female models
English women pop singers
Actresses from Greater Manchester
Actresses from Lancashire
People from Edgworth
Actors from Bolton
21st-century English women singers
21st-century English singers